John Stanley Brockington (born September 7, 1948) is an American former professional football player who was a running back
in the National Football League (NFL) with the Green Bay Packers and Kansas City Chiefs.

College career
Born and raised in Brooklyn in New York City, Brockington played halfback and fullback for the Ohio State Buckeyes from 1968 to 1970. He was one of the so-called Super Sophomores who led the Buckeyes to an undefeated season and a consensus national championship in 1968.  Brockington and the other Super Sophomores finished their college careers with a record 

Brockington played left halfback in 1968 and 1969, used primarily as a blocker for fullback Jim Otis and quarterback   In 1970, Brockington moved to the fullback position and was the featured running back in head coach Woody Hayes' offense.  Brockington finished his senior season with 1,142 rushing yards, which was at the time an Ohio State single-season record; he also scored 17 rushing touchdowns that season.

Brockington was selected onto the Buckeyes' All-Century Team in 2000, and was elected into the Varsity O Hall of Fame in 2002.

Professional career

Brockington was the ninth overall selection in the 1971 NFL Draft, after Jim Plunkett, Dan Pastorini, Archie Manning, and John Riggins, and ahead of Jack Tatum, Jack Youngblood, Jack Ham and Dan Dierdorf. Brockington became the first NFL player to ever rush for 1,000 or more yards in each of his first three seasons. In his rookie year of 1971 with the Green Bay Packers, Brockington was named NFL Offensive Rookie of the Year by the Associated Press, rushing for 1,105 yards and a 5.1 YPC in 14 games. Brockington retired with the second most rushing yards in Packers franchise history with 5,024 yards. As of December 2022 Brockington ranks fourth in all time rushing yards as a Packer. Brockington was also selected to three consecutive Pro Bowls (1971–1973).

His first running mate in the Green Bay backfield was sixth-year halfback Donny Anderson, another Packer first round draft choice, who was traded the following offseason to the St. Louis Cardinals for running back MacArthur Lane. Together, Brockington and Lane formed a dynamic running duo in the backfield, carrying the Packers offense between 1972 and 1974. The Packers won the NFC Central division in 1972 for their first playoff berth in five years.

With a running style based on his great strength, Brockington epitomized the power running back – a player who preferred to break tackles and run over defenders rather than run away from them. He was one of the first running backs to combine brute force with speed.

Brockington's success was short-lived; after eclipsing 1,000 yards rushing during each of his first three seasons, he ran for 883 yards in 1974 (with a career-high 43 receptions for 314 yards), but dipped to only 434 yards rushing on 3.0 YPC in 1975 under new head coach Bart Starr. This was the result of typical wear-and-tear, the trade of Lane in July 1975 and changes in the Packers' playbook that did not take advantage of Brockington's abilities. In 1976, he had 406 yards rushing with 3.5 YPC.

After the first game of the 1977 season, Brockington was released by the  Signed by the struggling Kansas City Chiefs three weeks  he appeared in ten games for them and retired following the season.

John Brockington Foundation

Established in 2002 after receiving a kidney transplant from his future wife Diane Scott, Brockington created  the John Brockington Foundation to aid others impacted by kidney disease. They provide free screenings and educational material to those who require it, and also provide food vouchers for people on dialysis. Kidney drives also aid those seeking new kidneys.

References

External links

1948 births
Living people
People from Brooklyn
American football running backs
Ohio State Buckeyes football players
Green Bay Packers players
National Conference Pro Bowl players
National Football League Offensive Rookie of the Year Award winners
Kansas City Chiefs players
Thomas Jefferson High School (Brooklyn) alumni